Jean-Philippe Fleurian (born 11 September 1965) is a former tennis player from France, who turned professional in 1985. In his career, he won one doubles title (1996, Marseille). The right-hander reached his highest ranking on the ATP Tour on 30 April 1990, when he became world No. 37. He now is retired and has two daughters.

Fleurian is today a member of the 'Champions for Peace' club, a group of 70 famous elite athletes committed to serving peace in the world through sport, created by Peace and Sport, a Monaco-based international organization.

ATP career finals

Singles: 2 (2 runner-ups)

Doubles: 4 (1 title, 3 runner-ups)

ATP Challenger and ITF Futures finals

Singles: 10 (6–4)

Doubles: 14 (8–6)

Performance timelines

Singles

Doubles

External links
 
 
 

French male tennis players
Hopman Cup competitors
Living people
Tennis players from Paris
1965 births